Ponneelan, born 1940 at Manikatti Pottal, Kanyakumari district) is the pen name of Kandeswara Bhaktavatsalan, a Tamil writer from Tamil Nadu, India. He is a Marxist and was influenced by Tamil Communist leader P. Jeevanandham in his younger days. He became a teacher and retired as the deputy director of school education for Tamil Nadu. He won the 1994 Sahitya Akademi Award for Tamil his novel Pudhiya Dharisanangal. He is currently the state president of the Tamil literary organisation Tamil Nadu Kalai Ilakkiya Perumandram. During 2005–2008, he was a member of the Central Board of Film Certification (censor board). He also wrote the script for the 2008 film Ayyavazhi.

Bibliography

Fiction

Novels
Karisal (1976)
Pudhiya Dharisanangal (1992)
Kollaikarargal
Marupakkam (2010)

Short story anthologies
Atthaani Makkal
Pottal Kadhaigal
Thedal
Oorril malarndadhu
Pudhiya mottugal
Idam maari vantha vaergal
Pullin kuzhanthaigal
Uravugal
Anbulla
Nithyamanadhu
Thirumanangal sorgathil nichayikka padukindrana

Non-fiction

Biographies
Jeeva enra manudan
Thamilagathin aanmeega vazhikaatti
Ragunathanin ilakkiya thadam
Therkilirundhu
Vaikunthar kaattum vaazhkai neri

Essay anthologies
Puvi engum santhi nilavuga
Tharkala thamil ilakkiyamum dravida sidhathangalum
Murpokku ilakkiya iyakkangal
Sudhanthira thamilagathil kalai ilakkiya iyakkangal
Sathi madhangalai paraom
Thaimozhi kalvi
Tamil nadu kalai ilakkiya perumandra varalaaru

References

External links
Ponneelan page at Tamil Authors.com

People from Kanyakumari district
Living people
1940 births
Recipients of the Sahitya Akademi Award in Tamil
Writers from Tamil Nadu
Tamil writers
Indian Tamil people
20th-century Indian essayists
20th-century Indian novelists
20th-century Indian short story writers